In chemistry, an amine oxide, also known as an amine N-oxide or simply N-oxide, is a chemical compound that contains the functional group , a nitrogen-oxygen coordinate covalent bond with three additional hydrogen and/or substituent-group side chains attached to N. Sometimes it is written as →O or, incorrectly, as .

In the strict sense, the term amine oxide applies only to oxides of tertiary amines. Sometimes it is also used for the analogous derivatives of primary and secondary amines.

Examples of amine oxides include pyridine-N-oxide, a water-soluble crystalline solid with melting point 62–67 °C, and N-methylmorpholine N-oxide, which is an oxidant.

Applications
Amine oxides are surfactants commonly used in consumer products such as shampoos, conditioners, detergents, and hard surface cleaners. Alkyl dimethyl amine oxide (chain lengths C10–C16) is the most commercially used amine oxide. In North America, more than 95% of amine oxides are used in home cleaning products. They serve as stabilizers, thickeners, emollients, emulsifiers, and conditioners with active concentrations in the range of 0.1–10%. The remainder (< 5%) is used in personal care, institutional, commercial products and for unique patented uses such as photography.

Properties 

Amine oxides are used as protecting group for amines and as chemical intermediates. Long-chain alkyl amine oxides are used as amphoteric surfactants and foam stabilizers.

Amine oxides are highly polar molecules and have a polarity close to that of quaternary ammonium salts. Small amine oxides are very hydrophilic and have an excellent water solubility and a very poor solubility in most organic solvents.

Amine oxides are weak bases with a pKb of around 4.5 that form R3N+−OH, cationic hydroxylamines, upon protonation at a pH below their pKb.

Synthesis 
Almost all amine oxides are prepared by the oxidation of either tertiary aliphatic amines or aromatic N-heterocycles. Hydrogen peroxide is the most common reagent both industrially and in academia, however peracids are also important. More specialised oxidising agents can see niche use, for instance Caro's acid or mCPBA. Spontaneous or catalysed reactions using molecular oxygen are rare. Certain other reactions will also produce amine oxides, such as the Cope elimination, however they are rarely employed.

Reactions 
Amine oxides exhibit many kinds of reactions.
Pyrolytic elimination. Amine oxides, when heated to 150–200 °C eliminate a hydroxylamine, resulting in an alkene. This pyrolytic syn-elimination reaction is known under the name Cope reaction. The mechanism is similar to that of the Hofmann elimination.
Reduction to amines. Amine oxides are readily converted to the parent amine by common reduction reagents including lithium aluminium hydride, sodium borohydride, catalytic reduction, zinc / acetic acid, and iron / acetic acid. Pyridine N-oxides can be deoxygenated by phosphorus oxychloride
 Sacrificial catalysis. Oxidants can be regenerated by reduction of N-oxides, as in the case of regeneration of osmium tetroxide by N-methylmorpholine N-oxide.
 O-Alkylation. Pyridine N-oxides react with alkyl halides to the O-alkylated product
 Bis-ter-pyridine derivatives adsorbed on silver surfaces are discussed to react with oxygen to bis-ter-pyridine N-oxide. This reaction can be followed by video-scanning tunneling microscopy with sub-molecular resolution.
 In the Meisenheimer rearrangement (after Jakob Meisenheimer) certain N-oxides R1R2R3N+O− rearrange to hydroxylamines R2R3N−O−R1
 in a 1,2-rearrangement:

or a 2,3-rearrangement:

 In the Polonovski reaction a tertiary N-oxide is cleaved by acetic acid anhydride to the corresponding acetamide and aldehyde:

Metabolites 

Amine oxides are common metabolites of medication and psychoactive drugs. Examples include nicotine, Zolmitriptan, and morphine.
 
Amine oxides of anti-cancer drugs have been developed as prodrugs that are metabolized in the oxygen-deficient cancer tissue to the active drug.

Human safety
Amine oxides (AO) are not known to be carcinogens, dermal sensitizers, or reproductive toxicants. They are readily metabolized and excreted if ingested. Chronic ingestion by rabbits found lower body weight, diarrhea, and lenticular opacities at a lowest observed adverse effect levels (LOAEL) in the range of 87–150 mg AO/kw bw/day. Tests of human skin exposure have found that after 8 hours less than 1% is absorbed into the body. Eye irritation due to amine oxides and other surfactants is moderate and temporary with no lasting effects.

Environmental safety
Amine oxides with an average chain length of 12.6 have been measured to be water-soluble at ~410 g L−1. They are considered to have low bioaccumulation potential in aquatic species based on log Kow data from chain lengths less than C14 (bioconcentration factor < 87%). Levels of AO in untreated influent were found to be 2.3–27.8 ug L−1, while in effluent they were found to be 0.4–2.91 ug L−1. The highest effluent concentrations were found in oxidation ditch and trickling filter treatment plants. On average, over 96% removal has been found with secondary activated sludge treatment. Acute toxicity in fish, as indicated by 96h LC50 tests, is in the range of 1,000–3,000 ug L−1 for carbon chain lengths less than C14. LC50 values for chain lengths greater than C14 range from 600 to 1400 ug L−1. Chronic toxicity data for fish is 420 ug/L. When normalized to C12.9, the NOEC is 310 ug L−1 for growth and hatchability.

See also 

 Functional group
 Amine, NR3
 Hydroxylamine, NR2OH
 Phosphine oxide, PR3=O
 Sulfoxide, R2S=O
 Azoxy, RN=N+(O−)R RN=N+RO−
 Aminoxyl group Radicals with the general structure R2N–O•
 :Category:Amine oxides, containing all articles on specific amine-oxide compounds

References

External links 
 Chemistry of amine oxides
 Surfactants, types and uses (pdf)
 The amine oxides homepage
 Nomenclature of nitrogen compounds
 IUPAC definition

 
Functional groups